Ameny was an ancient Egyptian vizier who lived at the end of the Twelfth Dynasty.

Ameny is only known from rock inscriptions near Aswan in Upper Egypt. Here many officials of the region but also court officials passing by on missions carved texts into the rocks, that often name their titles and family members. Amneny bears here the titles overseer of the city and vizier. His wife Sehetepibre-Nehy is mentioned in the inscriptions and she is known from other monuments as the daughter of the overseer of troops Ameny who lived for sure under Senusret III or Amenemhat III providing also a date for the vizier Ameny.

References

Weblink 
Ameny on Persons and Names of the Middle Kingdom

Ancient Egyptian overseers of the city
Viziers of the Twelfth Dynasty of Egypt